This is a list of the earliest films produced and released before 1930 during the Qing dynasty and Republican China, ordered by year of release.

For an alphabetical listing of Chinese films see :Category:Chinese films.

1905-1929

Mainland Chinese Film Production Totals

See also
Cinema of China
Best 100 Chinese Motion Pictures as chosen by the 24th Hong Kong Film Awards

Sources
中国影片大典 Encyclopaedia of Chinese Films. 1905-1930, 故事片·戏曲片. (1996). Zhong guo ying pian da dian: 1905-1930. Beijing: 中国电影出版社 China Movie Publishing House.

References

External links
IMDb list of Chinese films

1900s
Films
China
Films
China
Films
China

zh:中国大陆电影